One Arrow 95-1D is an Indian reserve of the One Arrow First Nation in Saskatchewan. It is 11 kilometres east of Duck Lake. In the 2016 Canadian Census, it recorded a population of 0 living in 1 of its 1 total private dwellings.

References

Indian reserves in Saskatchewan
Division No. 15, Saskatchewan